is a junction passenger railway station located in the city of Naruto, Tokushima Prefecture, Japan. It is operated by JR Shikoku. It has two station numbers: "T04" for the Kōtoku Line and "N04" for the Naruto Line.

Lines
Ikenotani Station is served by the Kōtoku Line and is 64.2 km from the beginning of the line at Takamatsu.

Layout
The station consists of two island platforms set in a "V"-shape. The island platform to the west serves two tracks of the Kōtoku Line while the one to the east serves two tracks of the Naruto Line.  A station building is located in the centre of the "V". This is unstaffed and serves only as a waiting room. An "E"-shaped footbridge provides access from the station building to either island platform. South of the platforms, the four tracks merge through a series of points into a single track towards . Steps and an elevator provide access to the island platform at the second level. Parking for bicycles is available under the elevated tracks.

Platforms

History
The station was opened on 1 July 1916 as s station on the  privately run Awa Electric Railway (later the Awa Railway). On 15 February 1923 a stretch of track was laid to Awa-Ōdera (now ) and Kajiyabara (now closed). On 1 July 1933: the Awa Railway was nationalized and Japanese Government Railways (JGR) took over control of the station. The station was operated as part of the Awa Line. The stretch of track to  became the Muya Line with Ikenotani Station now designated as the official start of the line, In the process of these changes, the station was moved to its present location. On 1 March 1952 the Muya Line was renamed the Naruto Line. On 1 April 1987 JNR (the successor to JGR) was privatized. JR Shikoku assumed control of the station. On 1 June 1988 the Kōtoku Main Line was renamed the Kōtoku Line.

Passenger statistics
In fiscal 2019, the station was used by an average of 162 passengers daily

Surrounding area
Naruto City Oasa Junior High School

See also
 List of Railway Stations in Japan

References

External links

 JR Shikoku timetable

Railway stations in Tokushima Prefecture
Railway stations in Japan opened in 1916
Naruto, Tokushima